Aaron Refvem (born October 6, 1997, in New York City, New York) is an American former actor. He took over the role of Morgan Corinthos in General Hospital on May 12, 2009. He also appeared on Grey's Anatomy as Jackson Prescott, Two and a Half Men as Chuck in 2008, and The Cleaner as a Young Brian. In 2009, he appeared in the premiere production of Stephen Schwartz's opera Séance on a Wet Afternoon.

Television credits
The Cleaner as young Brian (2008)
Two and a Half Men as Chuck (2008)
Grey's Anatomy as Jackson Prescott (2009)
Dexter as Boy in Remains to Be Seen (2009)
Sons of Anarchy as Cliff Weston (2009)
General Hospital as young Dante Falconeri (1 episode; 2010)
General Hospital as Morgan Corinthos (2009-2010)
Medium as Finn Miller (2010)
CSI: NY as Sam Harris (2010)
House M.D. as Roger (2010)
The Closer as Skander (2010)
Criminal Minds: Suspect Behavior as Paul Meeks (2011)

Filmography
Rockabye as Billy (2008)
The Van Pelt Family as Wallace Van Pelt (2008)
Little Canyon as Nat (2008)
Baby O as Mikey (2009)
Opposite Day as a child doctor (2009)
Final Fantasy VII: Advent Children Complete as Denzel
Identical as Young Mark / Rich Washington

External links

References

1997 births
Living people
American male child actors
American male soap opera actors